Sopor Aeternus & the Ensemble of Shadows (Latin: sopor aeternus "eternal slumber"; also referred to or stylized as Sopor Aeternus or Sopor) is a darkwave musical project based in Frankfurt, founded in 1989 by a multidiciplinary artist who uses the pseudonym "Anna-Varney Cantodea".

Discography

Demo tapes
The three demo tapes are often referred to as "Blut der schwarzen Rose" or "The Undead-Trilogy". Only the first has been released.

 Es reiten die Toten so schnell… (1989)
 Rufus (1992)
 Till Time and Times Are Done (1992)

Studio albums
 Ich töte mich... (1994)
 Todeswunsch (1995)
 The Inexperienced Spiral Traveller (1997)
 Dead Lovers' Sarabande (Face One) (1999)
 Dead Lovers' Sarabande (Face Two) (1999)
 Songs from the Inverted Womb (2000)
 Es reiten die Toten so schnell (2003)
 La Chambre d'Echo (2004)
 Les Fleurs du Mal - Die Blumen des Bösen (2007)
 A Triptychon of Ghosts (Part Two) - Have You Seen This Ghost? (2011)
 Poetica - All Beauty Sleeps (2013)
 Mitternacht (2014)
 The Spiral Sacrifice (2018)
 Death & Flamingos (2019)
 Island of the Dead (2020)

EPs and remix albums ("sister albums")
 Ehjeh Ascher Ehjeh (1995)
 Voyager - The Jugglers of Jusa (1997)
 Flowers in Formaldehyde (2004)
 Sanatorium Altrosa (Musical Therapy for Spiritual Dysfunction) (2008)
 A Triptychon of Ghosts (Part One) - A Strange Thing to Say (2010)
 A Triptychon of Ghosts (Part Three) - Children of the Corn (2011)
 Angel of the Golden Fountain (2015)
 The Story Of 'Es reiten die Toten so Schnell''' (2021)

Singles
 "The Goat" / "The Bells Have Stopped Ringing" (2005)
 "In der Palästra" (2007)
 "Imhotep" (2011)
 Reprise (2018)
 Vor Dem Tode Träumen Wir (2019)
 The Boy Must Die (2019)
 Architecture ll (Instrumental Version)(Remastered) (2021)
 Birth - Fiendish Figuration (The Inner Hell, Side.A) (Memories Are Haunted Places, Side.B) (2021)
 Averno - Inferno (Averno, Side.A) (Inferno, Side.B) (2021)
 The Dead (2021)
 Todesschlaf (2022)

Other releasesJekura - Deep the Eternal Forest (1995) – a compilation featuring four songs by Sopor Aeternus
 Nenia C'alladhan (2002) – a self-titled side project with Constance Fröhling
 Like a Corpse Standing in Desperation (2005) – a boxed set of rarities and hard-to-find albums
 The Goat and Other Re-Animated Bodies'' (2009) - DVD of previously released videos

References

External links
 Sopor Aeternus' official website
 Blog of Anna-Varney Cantodea
 Sopor Aeternus at VampireFreaks.com
 
 Sopor Aeternus on Reverbnation.com
 Official Sopor Aeternus retailer

 
Neue Deutsche Todeskunst groups
German dark wave musical groups
Musical groups established in 1989